Channels of Rage is a 2003 documentary film by Anat Halachmi.

Synopsis 
The film focuses on two young rap artists, Subliminal, an Israeli Jew, and Tamer Nafar, a Palestinian citizen of Israel, and focuses on their music, friendship, and their politicization as public figures. The film traces the relationship between Tamer and Subliminal, as the events of the Second Intifada unfold, and lets the viewer draw conclusions from the souring relations between the two as an individual representation of the polarization process which took place during these years of bloody conflict. In this aspect, the film succeeds in delivering the atmosphere of the loss of hopes for peace after the failure of the Camp David summit between Ehud Barak and Yasser Arafat and the renewed intensity of the conflict since. The film was featured in the San Francisco Jewish Film Festival.

See also
 Israeli hip hop
 Palestinian hip hop

References

External links
 

2003 films
Israeli documentary films
Israeli hip hop
2003 documentary films
Hebrew-language films
Arabic-language films
Documentary films about hip hop music and musicians
Documentary films about the Israeli–Palestinian conflict